WRYP (90.1 FM, "Renew FM") is a radio station licensed to Wellfleet, Massachusetts, United States, that serves the Cape Cod market and broadcasts a Christian format. The station is an affiliate of RenewFM and is licensed to Horizon Christian Fellowship.

The station was assigned the WRYP call letters by the Federal Communications Commission on May 9, 2006.

See also 
 RenewFM

References

External links 
 

 
 
 
 

RYP
Wellfleet, Massachusetts
RYP
Radio stations established in 2006